Emmanuel Ogoli (1989 – 12 December 2010) was a Nigerian professional footballer who played as a left back.

Career
Ogoli played club football for Bayelsa United and Ocean Boys. On 12 December 2010, Ogoli collapsed on the pitch while playing for Ocean Boys, and died later in hospital. Ogoli had earlier received a "horror injury" in a match on 14 November 2010. Both the Nigeria Premier League and the Nigeria Football Federation announced separate investigations into his death.

References

1989 births
2010 deaths
Nigerian footballers
Bayelsa United F.C. players
Association football players who died while playing
Association football fullbacks
Sport deaths in Nigeria